Feng Liao (馮嫽) was China's first official female diplomat, who represented the Han Dynasty to Wusun (烏孫), which was in the Western Regions. It was a practice for the Imperial Court to foster alliances with the northern tribes via marriage, and two Han princesses had married Wusun kings.

Feng Liao was the maidservant of Princess Jieyou (解憂公主), who was married off to a Wusun king. Feng herself later married an influential Wusun general, whose good standing with Prince Wujiutu (烏就屠) of the kingdom later proved beneficial to the Han dynasty.

When Prince Wujiutu seized the throne of Wusun in 64 BC, after his father died, there was fear in the Imperial Court of Han that Wujiutu, whose mother was Xiongnu, would allow Wusun to become Xiongnu's vassal.

Zheng Ji, Governor of the Western Regions, recalled that Feng Liao had married into Wusun and with her familiarity of the Wusun customs, she was a prime candidate to persuade Wujiutu to ally his kingdom with Han. Wujiutu acceded and Emperor Xuan of Han (漢宣帝) sent for Feng. He praised her for her judgement and diplomacy, and appointed her as the official envoy to Wusun.

Wujiutu was conferred the title "Little King of Wusun" while his brother, the son by a Han princess, was named "Great King of Wusun". Wusun was divided between the two kings and tensions in that region were eased.

References
Book of Han, vol. 96B.
 Evoking Past Glories in the Desert. (2001). Retrieved from https://web.archive.org/web/20110707050225/http://www.investchina.org.cn/english/culture/63515.htm.
Feng Menglong. (2000). Gujin Xiaoshuo  ("Stories Old and New"). (S. H. Yang & Y. Q. Yang, Trans.) Stories Old and New: A Ming Dynasty Collection. Seattle: University of Washington Press. (1620).
Peterson, Barbara Bennett (Ed.). (2000). Notable women of China: Shang dynasty to the early twentieth century. New York: M. E. Sharpe, Inc.
 Yu, Taishan. (2006). A Study of the History of the Relationship Between the Western and Eastern Han, Wei, Jin, Northern and Southern Dynasties and the Western Regions. Retrieved from http://www.sino-platonic.org/complete/spp173_chinese_dynasties_western0206.pdf.

Han dynasty diplomats
Han dynasty politicians